Herman Louis Duhring Jr. (March 24, 1874 - July 18, 1953) was an American architect from Philadelphia, Pennsylvania. He designed several buildings that are listed on the U.S. National Register of Historic Places.

Career
The son of an Episcopal minister, he attended the Department of Architecture at the University of Pennsylvania, and worked in the architectural offices of Mantle Fielding and Frank Furness. In 1897, he was the winner of the first Stewardson Traveling Scholarship for study in Europe. He returned to Philadelphia in 1898, and opened his own office. In 1899, he formed a partnership with R. Brognard Okie and Carl Ziegler – Duhring, Okie & Ziegler. Ziegler left the firm in 1918, and the partnership continued as Duhring & Okie until 1924, after which Duhring worked independently.

Between 1910 and 1930, Dr. George Woodward commissioned about 180 houses in the Chestnut Hill section of Philadelphia, using mostly architects Edmund B. Gilchrist, Robert Rodes McGoodwin and Duhring. Among the earliest were Duhring's innovative "Quadruple Houses" (1910) – four attached houses huddled together so that each shared one long and one short wall. These provided tenants with more privacy than row houses, and were cheaper to build than detached houses. Woodward built two sets of "Quads" on Benezet Street, and later three more sets on Nippon Street in Mount Airy. Duhring also designed dozens of Cotswold-style houses for Woodward. A replica of Sulgrave Manor, the English ancestral home of George Washington, was an attraction at the 1926 Sesquicentennial Exposition in Philadelphia. Woodward bought its interiors, and had them installed in his own replica, designed by Duhring, that stands at 200 West Willow Grove Avenue in Chestnut Hill.

Duhring managed the disassembly, relocation, reassembly, and restoration of two Georgian mansions – "Whitby Hall" in West Philadelphia was relocated to Haverford, Pennsylvania in 1922–24; and "Rocky Mills" near Ashland, Virginia was relocated to Richmond, Virginia in 1928. Whitby's magnificent staircase – a smaller-scale version of the staircase at Independence Hall – and other interiors were sold to the Detroit Institute of Arts to pay for the costly project. Duhring modernized the relocated "Rocky Mills" in a particularly sensitive way – by increasing the building's depth, he was able to insert bathrooms and closets between its unaltered front and back halves.

In 1931, the Philadelphia Society for the Preservation of Landmarks hired Duhring to restore the Powel House (built c. 1765). Once one of the grandest Georgian houses in Philadelphia, it was then being used as a warehouse and commercial building, and was facing demolition. Its ornate parlor had been removed and installed in the Metropolitan Museum of Art, and its ballroom had been removed and installed in the Philadelphia Museum of Art. The building was restored, its lost rooms were re-created, and the Society opened it as a house museum.
 
Duhring was a member of the Philadelphia Chapter of the American Institute of Architects, and was elected a Fellow in 1952.

Selected works
St. Peter's by-the-Sea Episcopal Church (1899), 611 Lincoln Street, Sitka, Alaska, designed by Duhring Jr., NRHP-listed.
See House (1899), 611 Lincoln Street, Sitka, Alaska, designed by Duhring Jr., NRHP-listed. The residence of the first Episcopal bishop of Alaska.
Church of the Redeemer (1908, burned and demolished 2012, re-creation under construction 2014), 20th and Atlantic Avenues, Longport, New Jersey, designed by Duhring, Okie & Ziegler, NRHP-listed. Duhring probably was the principal designer. His father was a friend of the donor of the land.
"Quadruple Houses" (1910), Benezet Street, Chestnut Hill, Philadelphia, Dr. George Woodward, client. A contributing property in Chestnut Hill Historic District.
Relocation of Whitby Hall (1922–24). Duhring managed the relocation of the 1754 Georgian mansion from 1601 South 58th Street, Philadelphia, Pennsylvania to Tunbridge Road, Haverford, Pennsylvania. It is now renamed "Whitby New."
Sulgrave Manor (1927), 200 West Willow Grove Avenue, Chestnut Hill, Philadelphia, Pennsylvania, Dr. George Woodward, client. The interiors came from a replica built for the 1926 Sesquicentennial Exposition.
Relocation of Rocky Mills (1928), NRHP-listed. Duhring managed the relocation of the circa-1750 Georgian mansion from outside Ashland, Virginia to 211 Ross Road, Richmond, Virginia. It is now renamed "Fairfield." 
Restoration of the Powel House (1931–33), 244 South 3rd Street, Philadelphia, Pennsylvania.

References
Pacita T. de la Cruz, Adaptive Reuse: An Early Twentieth-Century Approach in Chestnut Hill, Pennsylvania, by Dr. George Woodward, Developer, and Herman Louis Duhring Jr., Architect. Master of Science Thesis, University of Pennsylvania, 1984.

External links
Herman Louis Duhring, Jr. from Philadelphia Architects and Buildings.
H. Louis Duhring, Jr. from American Institute of Architects.

1874 births
1953 deaths
19th-century American architects
Architects from Philadelphia
Fellows of the American Institute of Architects
Preservationist architects
University of Pennsylvania School of Design alumni
20th-century American architects